Gardanbori-ye Olya (also Romanized as Gardanborī-ye ‘Olyā; also known as Bālā Gardan Borī) is a village in Karipey Rural District, Lalehabad District, Babol County, Mazandaran Province, Iran. At the 2006 census, its population was 175, in 44 families.

References 

Populated places in Babol County